The Cartier Racing Awards are awards in European horse racing, founded in 1991, and sponsored by Cartier. The award winners are decided by points earned in group races (40%) plus the votes cast by British racing journalists (30%) and readers of the Racing Post and The Daily Telegraph newspapers (30%).

Eight horse awards are given out annually plus the Daily Telegraph Award of Merit to the person whom members of the Cartier jury believe has done the most for European racing and/or breeding either over their lifetime or within the previous 12 months.

The highest Cartier award for horses is "Horse of the Year".

The equivalent in Australia is the Australian Thoroughbred racing awards, in Japan the JRA Awards, in Canada the Sovereign Awards, and in the United States the Eclipse Awards.

Horse names are followed by a suffix indicating the country where foaled.

Winners

Horse of the Year
 2022: Baaeed (GB)
 2021: St Mark's Basilica (FR)
 2020: Ghaiyyath (IRE) 
 2019: Enable (GB) 
 2018: Roaring Lion (USA)
 2017: Enable (GB)
 2016: Minding (IRE)
 2015: Golden Horn (GB)
 2014: Kingman (GB)
 2013: Treve (FR)
 2012: Frankel (GB)
 2011: Frankel (GB)
 2010: Goldikova (IRE)
 2009: Sea the Stars (IRE)
 2008: Zarkava (FR)
 2007: Dylan Thomas (IRE)
 2006: Ouija Board (GB)
 2005: Hurricane Run (IRE)
 2004: Ouija Board (GB)
 2003: Dalakhani (IRE)
 2002: Rock of Gibraltar (IRE)
 2001: Fantastic Light (US)
 2000: Giant's Causeway (US)
 1999: Daylami (IRE)
 1998: Dream Well (FR)
 1997: Peintre Celebre (US)
 1996: Helissio (FR)
 1995: Ridgewood Pearl (GB)
 1994: Barathea (IRE)
 1993: Lochsong (GB)
 1992: User Friendly (GB)
 1991: Arazi (US)

Top Older Horse
 2022: Baaeed (GB)
 2021: Palace Pier (GB)
 2020: Ghaiyyath (IRE)
 2019: Enable (GB)
 2018: Enable (GB)
 2017: Ulysses (IRE)
 2016: Found (IRE)
 2015: Solow (GB)
 2014: Noble Mission (GB)
 2013: Moonlight Cloud (GB)
 2012: Frankel (GB)
 2011: Cirrus des Aigles (FR)
 2010: Goldikova (IRE)
 2009: Goldikova (IRE)
 2008: Duke of Marmalade (IRE)
 2007: Dylan Thomas (IRE)
 2006: Ouija Board (GB)
 2005: Azamour (IRE)
 2004: Soviet Song (IRE)
 2003: Falbrav (IRE)
 2002: Grandera (IRE)
 2001: Fantastic Light (US)
 2000: Kalanisi (IRE)
 1999: Daylami (IRE)
 1998: Swain (IRE)
 1997: Pilsudski (IRE)
 1996: Halling (US)
 1995: Further Flight (GB)
 1994: Barathea (IRE)
 1993: Opera House (GB)
 1992: Mr Brooks (GB)
 1991: Terimon (GB)

Top Stayer
 2022: Kyprios (IRE)
 2021: Trueshan (FR)
 2020: Stradivarius (IRE)
 2019: Stradivarius (IRE)
 2018: Stradivarius (IRE)
 2017: Order of St George (IRE)
 2016: Order of St George (IRE)
 2015: Simple Verse (IRE)
 2014: Leading Light (IRE)
 2013: Estimate (IRE)
 2012: Colour Vision (FR)
 2011: Fame and Glory (IRE)
 2010: Rite of Passage (GB)
 2009: Yeats (IRE)
 2008: Yeats (IRE)
 2007: Yeats (IRE)
 2006: Yeats (IRE)
 2005: Westerner (GB)
 2004: Westerner (GB)
 2003: Persian Punch (IRE)
 2002: Vinnie Roe (IRE)
 2001: Persian Punch (IRE)
 2000: Kayf Tara (GB)
 1999: Kayf Tara (GB)
 1998: Kayf Tara (GB)
 1997: Celeric (GB)
 1996: Nononito (FR)
 1995: Double Trigger (IRE)
 1994: Moonax (IRE)
 1993: Vintage Crop (GB)
 1992: Drum Taps (US)
 1991: Turgeon (US)

Top Sprinter
 2022: Highfield Princess (FR)
 2021: Starman (GB)
 2020: Battaash (IRE)
 2019: Blue Point (IRE)
 2018: Mabs Cross (GB)
 2017: Harry Angel (IRE)
 2016: Quiet Reflection (GB)
 2015: Muhaarar (GB)
 2014: Sole Power (GB)
 2013: Lethal Force (IRE)
 2012: Black Caviar (AUS)
 2011: Dream Ahead (US)
 2010: Starspangledbanner (AUS)
 2009: Fleeting Spirit (GB)
 2008: Marchand d'Or (FR)
 2007: Red Clubs (IRE)
 2006: Reverence (GB)
 2005: Avonbridge (GB)
 2004: Somnus (GB)
 2003: Oasis Dream (GB)
 2002: Continent (GB)
 2001: Mozart (IRE)
 2000: Nuclear Debate (US)
 1999: Stravinsky (US)
 1998: Tamarisk (GB)
 1997: Royal Applause (GB)
 1996: Anabaa (US)
 1995: Hever Golf Rose (GB)
 1994: Lochsong (GB)
 1993: Lochsong (GB)
 1992: Mr Brooks (GB)
 1991: Sheikh Albadou (GB)

Three-Year-Old Colt
 2022: Vadeni (FR)
 2021: St Mark's Basilica (FR)
 2020: Palace Pier (GB)
 2019: Too Darn Hot (GB)
 2018: Roaring Lion (USA)
 2017: Cracksman (GB)
 2016: Almanzor (FR)
 2015: Golden Horn (GB)
 2014: Kingman (GB)
 2013: Magician (IRE)
 2012: Camelot (GB)
 2011: Frankel (GB)
 2010: Workforce (GB)
 2009: Sea the Stars (IRE)
 2008: New Approach (IRE)
 2007: Authorized (IRE)
 2006: George Washington (IRE)
 2005: Hurricane Run (IRE)
 2004: Bago (FR)
 2003: Dalakhani (IRE)
 2002: Rock of Gibraltar (IRE)
 2001: Galileo (IRE)
 2000: Sinndar (IRE)
 1999: Montjeu (IRE)
 1998: Dream Well (FR)
 1997: Peintre Celebre (US)
 1996: Helissio (FR)
 1995: Lammtarra (US)
 1994: King's Theatre (IRE)
 1993: Commander in Chief (GB)
 1992: Rodrigo de Triano (US)
 1991: Suave Dancer (US)

Three-Year-Old Filly
 2022: Inspiral (GB)
 2021: Snowfall (JPN)
 2020: Love (IRE)
 2019: Star Catcher (GB)
 2018: Alpha Centauri (IRE)
 2017: Enable (GB)
 2016: Minding (IRE)
 2015: Legatissimo (GB)
 2014: Taghrooda (GB)
 2013: Treve (FR)
 2012: The Fugue (GB)
 2011: Danedream (GER)
 2010: Snow Fairy (IRE)
 2009: Sariska (GB)
 2008: Zarkava (IRE)
 2007: Peeping Fawn (US)
 2006: Mandesha (FR)
 2005: Divine Proportions (US)
 2004: Ouija Board (GB)
 2003: Russian Rhythm (US)
 2002: Kazzia (GER)
 2001: Banks Hill (GB)
 2000: Petrushka (IRE)
 1999: Ramruma (US)
 1998: Cape Verdi (IRE)
 1997: Ryafan (US)
 1996: Bosra Sham (US)
 1995: Ridgewood Pearl (GB)
 1994: Balanchine (US)
 1993: Intrepidity (GB)
 1992: User Friendly (GB)
 1991: Kooyonga (IRE)

Two-Year-Old Colt
 2022: Blackbeard (IRE)
 2021: Native Trail (GB)
 2020: Van Gogh (USA)
 2019: Pinatubo (IRE)
 2018: Too Darn Hot (GB)
 2017: U S Navy Flag (USA)
 2016: Churchill (IRE)
 2015: Air Force Blue (USA)
 2014: Gleneagles (IRE)
 2013: Kingston Hill (GB)
 2012: Dawn Approach (IRE)
 2011: Dabirsim (FR)
 2010: Frankel (GB)
 2009: St Nicholas Abbey (IRE)
 2008: Mastercraftsman (IRE)
 2007: New Approach (IRE)
 2006: Teofilo (IRE)
 2005: George Washington (IRE)
 2004: Shamardal (USA)
 2003: One Cool Cat (USA)
 2002: Hold That Tiger (US)
 2001: Johannesburg (US)
 2000: Tobougg (IRE)
 1999: Fasliyev (USA)
 1998: Aljabr (USA)
 1997: Xaar (GB)
 1996: Revoque (IRE) & Bahamian Bounty (GB)
 1995: Alhaarth (IRE)
 1994: Celtic Swing (GB)
 1993: First Trump (GB)
 1992: Zafonic (USA)
 1991: Arazi (USA)

 Revoque was named Champion Two-Year-Old; Bahamian Bounty was named Champion Two-Year-Old Colt.

Two-Year-Old Filly
 2022: Lezoo (GB)
 2021: Inspiral (GB)
 2020: Pretty Gorgeous (FR)
 2019: Quadrilateral (GB)
 2018: Skitter Scatter (USA)
 2017: Happily (IRE)
 2016: Lady Aurelia (USA)
 2015: Minding (IRE)
 2014: Tiggy Wiggy (IRE)
 2013: Chriselliam (IRE)
 2012: Certify (US)
 2011: Maybe (IRE)
 2010: Misty for Me (IRE)
 2009: Special Duty (GB)
 2008: Rainbow View (USA)
 2007: Natagora (FR)
 2006: Finsceal Beo (IRE)
 2005: Rumplestiltskin (IRE)
 2004: Divine Proportions (USA)
 2003: Attraction (GB)
 2002: Six Perfections (FR)
 2001: Queen's Logic (IRE)
 2000: Superstar Leo (IRE)
 1999: Torgau (IRE)
 1998: Bint Allayl (GB)
 1997: Embassy (GB)
 1996: Pas de Reponse (USA)
 1995: Blue Duster (USA)
 1994: Gay Gallanta (USA)
 1993: Lemon Souffle (GB)
 1992: Lyric Fantasy (IRE)
 1991: Culture Vulture (USA)

The Daily Telegraph Award of Merit
 2022: Kirsten Rausing
 2021: David Elsworth
 2020: John Gosden
 2019: Pat Smullen
 2018: David Oldrey
 2017: Michael Stoute
 2016: Aidan O'Brien
 2015: Jack Berry
 2014: Hamdan Al Maktoum
 2013: Jim Bolger
 2012: Team Frankel
 2011: Barry Hills
 2010: Richard Hannon, Sr.
 2009: John Oxx
 2008: Sheikh Mohammed
 2007: Niarchos family
 2006: Peter Willett
 2005: Henry Cecil
 2004: David & Patricia Thompson
 2003: Lord Oaksey
 2002: Prince Khalid Abdullah
 2001: John Magnier
 2000: Aga Khan IV
 1999: Peter Walwyn
 1998: Head family
 1997: Peter O'Sullevan
 1996: Frankie Dettori
 1995: John Dunlop
 1994: Marquess of Hartington
 1993: François Boutin
 1992: Lester Piggott
 1991: Henri Chalhoub

Other awards
2002
 Special Award – Tony McCoy

2000
 Millennium Award of Merit – Queen Elizabeth II

Records
Leading horses:
 5 wins: Frankel, Enable
 4 wins: Ouija Board, Yeats
 3 wins: Goldikova, Lochsong, Kayf Tara, Minding, Stradivarius

Leading trainers:
 38 wins: Aidan O'Brien
 20 wins: John Gosden
 15 wins: Saeed bin Suroor
 10 wins: Henry Cecil

References

 bbc.co.uk – "Sea the Stars named horse of year" (2009)
 independent.ie – "Sea the Stars team clean up at Cartier awards" (2009)

Horse racing awards
Horse racing in France
German sports trophies and awards
Horse racing in Great Britain
Horse racing in Ireland
Cartier